Hypotrix trifascia is a moth of the family Noctuidae. It is found from southern Utah and Colorado southward through Arizona, New Mexico, and western Texas to northern Mexico.

The wingspan is 27–28 mm. Adults are on wing from early April to mid-July and early to late September.

External links
A revision of the genus Hypotrix Guenée in North America with descriptions of four new species and a new genus (Lepidoptera, Noctuidae, Noctuinae, Eriopygini)
Images

Hypotrix
Moths described in 1891